Repower (until May 2010 Rätia Energie AG) is an international energy utility with its operational headquarters in Poschiavo (Canton Graubünden, Switzerland). The company's history goes back more than 100 years, with the foundation in 1904 of Kraftwerke Brusio AG. Its key markets include Switzerland and Italy. The group operates along the entire value chain, from generation and trading to sales.

The Repower Group employs 607 people, plus 504 sales agents in Italy and 35 apprentices in Switzerland.

History 
For more than 100 years, Repower has been one of the largest providers of electricity in Switzerland. Founded in 1904 as Kraftwerke Brusio AG, the same year the company started construction of its first power plant − at the time the largest high-pressure hydropower installation in Europe − in Campocologno in the Poschiavo region of Canton Graubünden, Switzerland. Proximity to the Italian border precipitated the company's involvement in international projects and business activities. In 2000, Kraftwerke Brusio AG (Poschiavo), AG Bündner Kraftwerke (Klosters) and Rhätische Werke für Elektrizität AG (Thusis) merged to create the Rätia Energie AG group, which was subsequently joined by aurax ag (Ilanz) in 2004. In 2002 the group embarked on business in Italy. In 2010, Rätia Energie AG was renamed Repower AG.

Shareholder structure 
The company's shareholders are:
 Elektrizitätswerke des Kantons Zürich 38.49%
Canton Graubünden 27.00%
UBS Clean Energy Infrastructure Switzerland KGK (UBS CEIS) 22.08%
Free float 12.43%

Financial highlights 
Repower prepares its accounts in Swiss francs. Its 2021 results were announced on 5 April 2022.

Executive board 
The executive board comprises the following members:
 Roland Leuenberger, CEO of Repower Group
 Lorenzo Trezzini, Head of Finance, CFO
 Fabio Bocchiola, Head of Italy
 Michael Roth, Head of Power Generation & Grid
 Dario Castagnoli, Head of Trading, Origination & IT

Offices 
In Switzerland the group has offices in Bever, Küblis, Ilanz, Landquart, Poschiavo and Zurich. In Italy it operates out of an office in Milan.

External links 
 Repower AG

References 

Electric power companies of Switzerland
Hydroelectricity in Switzerland